Broomhall may refer to:

Broomhall, Cheshire, England
Broomhall (surname)
Broomhall House, near Dunfermline, Fife, Scotland

See also
Broom Hall, building in Sheffield, England
Broomhill, Sheffield, district in South Yorkshire, England
Broomhill (disambiguation)